Kurt von Behr (1 March 1890 in Hannover – 19 April 1945 in Kloster Banz) headed the Nazi art looting organisation, Einsatzstab Reichsleiter Rosenberg (ERR), in Paris and was involved in the M-Action which looted the home furnishings of French Jews.

Life 
Baron von Behr, originally of Mecklenburg nobility, was Oberführer of the German Red Cross. On 7 August 1924, he married the Englishwoman Joy Guzman Clarke (born 16 May 1896 in British India). From 1932 to 1934, he headed the Nazi (NSDAP) organization in Italy. In 1936, Behr worked for the Rosenberg Foreign Policy Office in Palma.

Nazi looter in France 
During the German occupation of Paris in 1940, von Behr played a major role in looting art from Jews. As deputy to the staff leader Gerhard Utikal, von Behr headed the Einsatzstab Reichsleiter Rosenberg (ERR), West Department in Paris. His mission was to steal “abandoned cultural property of Jews”. Alfred Rosenberg and his associate Kurt von Behr were "ruthless and eager to be Hitler's creatures". Von Behr also supplied Hermann Göring with stolen works of art. From 17 July 1940 to 20 February 1941, he sent paintings looted from France and French Jews to the German Reich.

From January 1942 to August 1944 he headed the M-Aktion in Paris, which stole the furniture, pianos and other home furnishings from the homes of French Jews and sent them to Germany to be distributed to German citizens of the Reich. Von Behr was involved in Nazi looting and part of a network of Nazi functionaries and art dealers that plundered property from Jews to raise cash to support the war effort, to enrich private Nazi collections or for personal gain. In its analysis of Nazi art looting, the OSS Art Looting Intelligence Unit wrote of von Behr, " As head of ERR, Paris, the individual chiefly responsible for organised looting in France." Along with Bruno Lohse, von Behr was considered one of the "masterminds of the artistic plunder enacted by the ERR in France."

Suicide of von Behr 
After the arrival of Allied troops, von Behr and his wife committed suicide, with hydrogen cyanide on 19 April 1945.

In von Behr's residence, Schloss Banz, the US armed forces found not only large holdings of  books looted from Western and Eastern European libraries, but also ERR archive files that had been relocated there, which provided the basis of the Nuremberg trial against Alfred Rosenberg.

Literature 
 Léon Poliakov, Joseph Wulf: Das Dritte Reich und die Juden. Wiesbaden 1989, .
 Ulrike Hartung: Verschleppt und verschollen. Eine Dokumentation deutscher, sowjetischer und amerikanischer Akten zum NS-Kunstraub in der Sowjetunion (1941–1948). Temmen, Bremen 2000, .
 Götz Aly: Hitlers Volksstaat. Raub, Rassenkrieg und nationaler Sozialismus. S. Fischer, Frankfurt am Main 2005, S. 142–146 (mit Fotos).
 Ernst Klee: Das Kulturlexikon zum Dritten Reich. Wer war was vor und nach 1945. S. Fischer, Frankfurt am Main 2007, S. 37 f.
 Heinz Pfuhlmann: Der Einsatzstab Reichsleiter Rosenberg in Banz 1944/45. In: Banz ..45. Ein Kloster im Mittelpunkt bedeutender Kriegsgeschehnisse. Kloster Banz, 2017, S. 58–71.
 Hanns Christian Löhr: Kunst als Waffe – Der Einsatzstab Reichsleiter Rosenberg, Ideologie und Kunstraub im „Dritten Reich“. Berlin 2018, .

See also 
 Alfred Rosenberg
 The Holocaust in France
 Einsatzstab Reichsleiter Rosenberg 
 Nazi plunder
 Nuremberg Trials

References and comments

External links 
 Beleg für vermutete Gestapo-Tätigkeit Aus angeblicher Unterlage des französischen Aussenministeriums von 1936, die auf einer privaten Homepage abgebildet ist. Eingesehen 28. September 2013
 Fotografie der Unterlage des französischen Aussenministeriums von 1936, die auf einer privaten Homepage abgebildet ist.
 James S. Plaut: Loot for the Master Race. in The Atlantic online, September 1946.
 Eintrag Baron Kurt von Behr (mit Bild) im Glossar der Datenbank des Jüdischen Museums Berlin
 Eintrag Kurt von Behr in der Lost Art Datenbank, Deutsches Zentrum Kulturgutverluste www.lostart.de; online
Activity of the Einsatzstab Reichsleiter Rosenberg in France: C.I.R. No.1 15 August 1945

German Red Cross personnel
Gestapo agents
Nazi-looted art
Nazi Party members
1890 births
1945 suicides
Nazis who committed suicide in Germany
Suicides by cyanide poisoning